Corticibacterium  is a genus of bacteria from the family Phyllobacteriaceae with one known species (Corticibacterium populi).

References

Phyllobacteriaceae
Bacteria genera
Monotypic bacteria genera